Percival Clyde Johnson (8 October 1930 – 27 December 2014) was an Australian rules footballer who played with North Melbourne in the Victorian Football League (VFL) during the 1950s.

A wingman or rover, Johnson was known for his pace and aggression.

In 1956 he commenced training with  but did not play a senior VFL game for them.

References

External links

1930 births
Australian rules footballers from Victoria (Australia)
Indigenous Australian players of Australian rules football
North Melbourne Football Club players
2014 deaths